The Seventy-ninth Texas Legislature met from 11 January to 30 May 2005 in regular session, and in consecutive called sessions from 21 June to 20 July (First called session) and 21 July to 19 August 2005 (Second called session). It met again in 2006 from  17 April to 16 May. Most of the members of the House of Representatives and 15 members of the Senate were elected in the 2004 general election; the other House members were elected in special elections held in 2006.

Sessions
 79th Regular session: 11 January 2005 – 30 May 2005
 79th First called session: 21 June 2005 – 20 July 2005
To consider legislation that addresses educator compensation, benefits and certification.

To consider legislation that provides for public school financial accountability and that increases transparency in school district financial reporting.

To consider legislation that provides for performance-based incentives to educators and schools that attain higher levels of student achievement.

To consider legislation that funds textbooks and that creates the instructional materials allotment for public schools.

To consider legislation that provides for charter school funding and reform.

To consider legislation that provides for modifications to the recapture provisions of the public school finance system.

To consider legislation that provides for November elections for public school boards of trustees.

To consider legislation providing funding for the public school finance system and the continuation of the Texas Education Agency.

To consider legislation providing for end-of-course examinations to be used in public schools.

To consider legislation that provides for increased accountability and intervention for schools failing to meet state standards.

To consider legislation that provides for local property tax rate compression and voter approval of local property tax rates.

To consider legislation that establishes indicators of college readiness and higher levels of student achievement in the public school accountability system. 

Legislation relating to limiting the use of eminent domain to take private property for private parties or economic development purposes. 
 79th Second called session: 21 July 2005 – 19 August 2005
To consider legislation to limit the ad valorem tax appraisals and rates of certain taxing units.

To consider legislation that provides ad valorem tax relief and protects taxpayers.

To consider legislation to increase the homestead ad valorem tax exemption. 

Legislation that addresses educator compensation, benefits, and certification.

Legislation that provides for public school financial accountability and that increases transparency in school district financial reporting.

Legislation that provides for performance-based incentives to educators and schools that attain higher levels of student achievement.

Legislation that funds textbooks and that creates the instructional materials allotment for public schools.

Legislation that provides for charter school funding and reform.

Legislation that provides for modifications to the recapture provisions of the public school finance system.

Legislation that provides for November elections for public school boards of trustees.

Legislation providing funding for the public school finance system and the continuation of the Texas Education Agency.

Legislation providing for end-of-course examinations to be used in public schools.

Legislation that provides for increased accountability and intervention for schools failing to meet state standards.

Legislation that provides for local property tax rate compression and voter approval of local property tax rates.

Legislation that establishes indicators of college readiness and higher levels of student achievement in the public school accountability system.

Legislation relating to the authorization, issuance, and funding of tuition revenue bonds. 

Legislation relating to an increase in the compensation of judges, including salary and retirement benefits. 

Legislation related to further competition in the telecommunications market.

Legislation related to the provision of broadband over powerlines.

Legislation related to the issuance of state-issued certificate of franchise authority for cable and video services. 

 79th Third called session: 17 April 2006

Party summary

Senate

House of Representatives

Officers

Senate
 Lieutenant Governor: David Dewhurst, Republican
 President Pro Tempore: 
 'Regular Session': Florence Shapiro, Republican
 'Ad Interim' (30 May 2005-16 April 2006): Frank Madla, Democrat
 'Ad Interim' (17 April 2006-8 January 2007): Royce West, Democrat

House of Representatives
 Speaker of the House: Tom Craddick, Republican

Members
Members of the Seventy-ninth Texas Legislature at the beginning of the regular session, 11 January 2005:

Senate

House of Representatives

: In the 2004 General Election, Elizabeth Ames Jones won the District 121 seat but declined it, having received an appointment as a member of the Texas Railroad Commission.

Membership changes

Senate
None

House of Representatives

  District 48: A special election was held on 17 January 2006. No candidate received a majority of the votes on that date, so the top two candidates will face each other in a runoff.  Lieutenant Governor David Dewhurst, as acting governor, set the date of the runoff for 14 February 2006. . Donna Howard won the runoff and was later sworn in.
  District 106: A special election was held on 28 February 2006 . Kirk England won, but, as of 6 March 2006, has not yet been sworn in.
  District 121: A special election was held on 5 February 2005.  Joe Straus received a majority of the votes. He was sworn in five days later, on 10 February 2005.
  District 143: A special election was held on 8 November 2005. No candidate received a majority of the votes on that date, so the top two candidates faced each other in a runoff on 10 December 2005. Ana E. Hernandez won the runoff and was sworn in 10 days later, on 20 December 2005.

Notable events
Sushree Prabhakari Devi, Vice-President of Barsana Dham Hindu Temple, delivered the first ever Hindu prayer in the Texas Senate.

External links

79th Texas Legislature
2005 in Texas
2006 in Texas
2005 U.S. legislative sessions
2006 U.S. legislative sessions